Hegyeshalom (Hungarian: Hegyeshalom vasútállomás) is a railway station in Hegyeshalom, Győr-Moson-Sopron County, Hungary. Opened on 24 December 1855, it is an important border station between Austria and Hungary. The station is located on the main line between Vienna and Budapest (Line 1 Budapest–Hegyeshalom railway and the Ostbahn) and also Line 16 Hegyeshalom–Szombathely railway and Line 132 Bratislava–Hegyeshalom railway. The train services are operated by MÁV START.

The station has a plinthed MÁV Class 411 steam locomotive.

Train services
The station is served by the following services:

RailJet services Zürich - Innsbruck - Salzburg - Linz - St Pölten - Vienna - Győr - Budapest
RailJet services Munich - Salzburg - Linz - St Pölten - Vienna - Győr - Budapest
RailJet services Frankfurt - Stuttgart - Munich - Salzburg - Linz - St Pölten - Vienna - Győr - Budapest
EuroCity services Vienna - Győr - Budapest - Kiskunmajsa - Novi Sad - Belgrade
EuroCity services Vienna - Győr - Budapest - Debrecen - Nyíregyháza
Regional services  Bruck an der Leitha - Hegyeshalom - Győr
Local services Rajka - Hegyeshalom - Győr
Local services Rajka - Hegyeshalom - Csorna

References

External links

Railway stations opened in 1855
Railway stations in Hungary